Algeria competed at the 2019 African Games held from 19 to 31 August 2019 in Rabat, Morocco. On 17 August, judo events began two days before the opening ceremony on the first day, Algeria achieved 9 medals, including two gold medals by Wail Ezzine in weight 66 kg and Faïza Aissahine in weight 52 kg. On the second and last day were content with only two medals silver and bronze.

Medal summary

Medal table

Archery 

Algeria competed in archery.

Athletics 

Algeria competed in athletics with 11 (8 men and 3 women).

Men
Track & road events

Field events

Combined events – Decathlon

Women
Track & road events

Badminton 

Algeria competed in badminton with 9 athletes (5 men and 4 women).

Boxing 

Algeria participate in Boxing with 11 boxers (8 men and 3 Women),.

Men

Women

Cycling

Algeria competed in cycling with 11 cyclists.

Road

Mountain biking

Equestrian 

Algeria competed in equestrian with six team members. They won the bronze medal in the Men's Team jumping event.

Football 

Algeria women's national under-20 football team competed in the women's tournament at the 2019 African Games.

Group stage

Group A

Gymnastics

Handball 

Both Algeria's national handball team and women's national handball team competed in handball.

Men

Group B

Quarterfinals

Women

Group B

Quarterfinals

Judo

Men

Women

Karate

Algeria competed in karate and the country finished 3rd in the karate medal table.

Rowing

Algeria is scheduled to compete in Rowing with 4 (2 men and 2 Women).

Qualification Legend: FA=Final A (medal); FB=Final B (non-medal); R=Repechage

Shooting

Algeria competed in shooting with 14 (9 men and 5 Women). In total sport shooters representing Algeria won one bronze medal and the country finished in 4th place in the shooting medal table.

Swimming

Men

Qualification Legend: FA=Final A (medal); FB=Final B (non-medal)

Women

Qualification Legend: FA=Final A (medal); FB=Final B (non-medal)

Mixed

Qualification Legend: FA=Final A (medal); FB=Final B (non-medal)

Table tennis 

Algeria competed in table tennis with 8 (4 men and 4 Women).

Taekwondo

Volleyball 

Algeria women's national volleyball team is scheduled to compete in the 2019 African Games. The men's team is also scheduled to compete.

Beach

Pool C

|}

Indoor

Weightlifting 

Algeria competed in weightlifting.

In total weightlifters representing Algeria won six silver medals and nine bronze medals.

Wrestling 

Algeria competed in wrestling with 15 (11 men and 4 Women).
Men's Freestyle

Women's Freestyle

Men's Greco-Roman

References 

Nations at the 2019 African Games
2019
African Games